Marija Mičev (born 7 November 1996) is a Serbian para taekwondo athlete. She won silver medal in the women's –58 kg	category at the 2019 World Para Taekwondo Championships and bronze medal in the same category at the 2017 European Para Taekwondo Championships. She participated at the 2020 Summer Paralympics in Tokyo.

References

Taekwondo practitioners at the 2020 Summer Paralympics
Paralympic taekwondo practitioners of Serbia
Living people
1996 births
Sportspeople from Belgrade
21st-century Serbian women